German submarine U-409 was a Type VIIC U-boat of Nazi Germany's Kriegsmarine in World War II.
She was laid down on 26 October 1940 by Danziger Werft, Danzig as yard number 110, launched on 23 September 1941 and commissioned on 21 January 1942 under Oberleutnant zur See Hanns-Ferdinand Massmann.

Design
German Type VIIC submarines were preceded by the shorter Type VIIB submarines. U-409 had a displacement of  when at the surface and  while submerged. She had two shafts and two  propellers.

U-409 was fitted with five  torpedo tubes (four fitted at the bow and one at the stern), fourteen torpedoes, one  SK C/35 naval gun, 220 rounds, and a  C/30 anti-aircraft gun. The boat had a complement of between forty-four and sixty.

Service history
The boat's career began with training at 5th U-boat Flotilla on 21 January 1942, followed by active service on 1 September 1942 as part of the 9th Flotilla. The following year, she transferred to 29th Flotilla for operations in the Mediterranean.

Wolfpacks
U-409 took part in six wolfpacks, namely:
 Vorwärts (25 August – 2 September 1942)
 Streitaxt (20 October – 1 November 1942)
 Raufbold (11 – 18 December 1942)
 Sturmbock (21 – 26 February 1943)
 Wildfang (26 February – 5 March 1943)
 Westmark (6 – 11 March 1943)

Fate
U-409 was sunk on 12 July 1943 in the Mediterranean NE of Algiers, in position , by depth charges from the Royal Navy destroyer .

Summary of raiding history

See also
 Mediterranean U-boat Campaign (World War II)

References

Notes

Citations

Bibliography

External links

German Type VIIC submarines
1941 ships
U-boats commissioned in 1942
U-boats sunk in 1943
U-boats sunk by depth charges
U-boats sunk by British warships
World War II shipwrecks in the Mediterranean Sea
World War II submarines of Germany
Ships built in Danzig
Maritime incidents in July 1943